Nostalgia Critic is an American review comedy web series created, directed by and starring web comedian Douglas "Doug" Walker. The series initially launched on YouTube on July 3, 2007, before moving to Walker's own site, That Guy with the Glasses, then to Channel Awesome. The show follows Walker as the title character, a bitter and sarcastic critic who mostly reviews films and television shows from his childhood and recent past, usually with comically exaggerated rage. The show often alternates the Critic's angry rants and humor with analysis of the episode's subject. Some of the films he reviewed (such as Exorcist II: The Heretic, The Garbage Pail Kids Movie, and Batman & Robin) are generally considered as the worst films ever made.

Walker briefly retired the series on August 14, 2012, to work on other projects, even writing the character out of existence in the Channel Awesome film To Boldly Flee. On January 22, 2013, Walker announced the show's return in a narrative video called "The Review Must Go On". The show subsequently returned with a more narrative- and sketch-driven sixth season, beginning on February 5, 2013, with a review of The Odd Life of Timothy Green. Most episodes still retain the original clip-using format.

Main cast
 Doug Walker: Nostalgia Critic, the aggressive, childish and hot-tempered film critic and a fictionalized version of Doug Walker himself. He is characterized by his angry rants and hatred of bad movies. All of the reviews star him as the main character and feature him providing commentary and criticism while talking directly to the audience.
 Rob Walker: Rob is Doug's real-life older brother who appears in most of the Critic's videos as "The Other Guy" as well as different minor and major characters, notably Santa Christ.
 Malcolm Ray: Malcolm is one of the Critic's friends who appears on the show and works with him on his videos. Malcolm often plays many secondary characters, most notably as the Devil in some of the sketches.
 Rachel Tietz: She is a friend of the Critic's who worked with him and Malcolm on the show. She played multiple characters, including Evilina (the daughter of the Devil and Kim Kardashian) and Rita Repulsa (though her voice was dubbed by Doug Walker in that role). She later left the show after season six to pursue her career in Los Angeles but has made some cameos in later episodes, most recently in the review of The Nutcracker in 3D.
 Tamara Chambers: After Rachel left the show to pursue a career in Los Angeles, Tamara stepped in to take her place. She has her own short series called Tamara's Never Seen, where she watches iconic movies for the first time. She also plays a recurring character called Hyper Fangirl. She also has a second short series called Tamara Just Saw.
 Jim Jarosz: Jim is a friend of the Critic's who often works with Tamara and Malcolm, though he is not present in every episode as Tamara and Malcolm are. He is mainly responsible for most of the props and set pieces in the show, most notably for the review of Mad Max: Fury Road.
 Walter Banasiak: Walter is one of the hosts of Awesome Comics & Coffee, another show on Channel Awesome, alongside Jim and Heather Reusz. He also created the show Top 5, in which he counts down his Top 5 favorite or least favorite things. He also runs Bat-May, in which he reviews episodes from Batman: The Animated Series during the entire month of May, and Twilight-Tober Zone, in which he reviews episodes of The Twilight Zone during the entire month of October. 
 Heather Reusz: Heather, besides starring alongside the cast in Nostalgia Critic skits, helps to run the Twitch channel, where the cast play video games, watch movies, or just chat with the audience.
 Aiyanna Wade: Aiyanna was a featured panelist on Awesome Comics and was one of the co-hosts the Orbit Report with Heather Reusz as well as the Top 5 Best/Worst with Heather and Walter Banasiak.
 Chaplin & Buster: Doug Walker's two pet cats who appear as talking versions of themselves in various skits. They are known for repeatedly announcing their own names for no reason, as in "I'm Chaplin/Buster!". They are mentored by The Cinema Snob's own talking pet cat, Lloyd.

(Note: All of the cast members often play fictionalized versions of their real counterparts.)
(Note 2: The series has also featured guest stars Dante Basco, Don Bluth, Kyle Hebert, JonTron, Maurice LaMarche, Rob Paulsen, James Rolfe, Tom Ruegger, Michael Salvatori, Greg Sestero, Sherri Stoner, Chris Stuckmann, Cree Summer, Rob Scallon, Corey Taylor and Mara Wilson as themselves; co-reviewing, acting in sketch segments, or making a cameo appearance)

History
The series was initially launched on YouTube on July 3, 2007, with a review of Transformers, but episodes were frequently removed by the website following complaints of copyright infringement. In April 2008, the videos were taken down from YouTube but an arrangement between the company and content host Blip in 2009 resulted in them being featured on YouTube once more.

The announcement of a spin-off, called The Nostalgia Chick, was created in "The Search for the Nostalgia Chick" (August 10, 2008). The concept was for a female host to review female-targeted "nostalgic" films and television, and though it was presented as a contest, it was predetermined that all three candidates would end up on the site: Lindsay Ellis (who reviewed Disney's Pocahontas), Krissy Diggs (who reviewed Sailor Moon), and Kaylyn Saucedo (who reviewed The Last Unicorn). Ellis, then using the name "The Dudette," took the Nostalgia Chick title, as announced on the site, "Nostalgia Chick Winner!" (September 15, 2008). Diggs and Saucedo then joined That Guy with the Glasses as That Chick with the Goggles and Marzgurl, respectively.

On September 14, 2012, Walker announced the retirement of Nostalgia Critic and that it would no longer be a weekly production, as he and his brother felt that they had gone as far as they could with the series. Walker then focused his efforts on another web series called Demo Reel, but on January 22, 2013, Walker released a sketch short film titled "The Review Must Go On", announcing the return of the Nostalgia Critic; Malcolm Ray and Rachel Tietz of Demo Reel joined the series as side characters. On December 30, 2015, Nostalgia Critic aired its 300th episode, a review of Star Wars: The Force Awakens. On October 10, 2018, Nostalgia Critic aired its 400th episode, a countdown of the top 11 Stephen King movies. On October 14, 2020, it aired its 500th episode, a review of The Stand. On November 9, 2022, the series aired its 600th episode, a review of Anastasia.

Episode format
The series focuses on the Nostalgia Critic, a short-tempered film reviewer looking back at films usually from his childhood and adolescence. GigaOM describes it as "high energy and shamelessly nerdy". Reuters described him as having "offbeat personalities". In each episode, the Critic restates important plot-points, guiding the viewer, while making jokes out of notable or questionable scenes. The reviews are interspersed with recurring memes, false or satirical dubbing of dialogue, comedic sketches and pop culture gagssuch as making fun of famous actors who starred in lesser-known roles before their rise to fame. The show also features special episodes, such as the "Top 11" list countdowns for his favorite or least favorite films, villains, or moments in television shows; and "Old vs. New" which compares the reboot of a popular film or series to the original.

Since the revival of the series in 2013, Walker occasionally produces an editorial which discusses relevant film topics; while still featuring the Critic persona, these videos are much less comedic and contain no sketches or other actors. Beginning with Jurassic World on June 23, 2015, the series also occasionally features "clipless reviews" of films that are still currently in theaters to avoid copyright infringement instead of stills and clips. These reviews instead feature scenes from the movies re-enacted comedically by Walker, his family and other Channel Awesome contributors.

Walker describes his philosophy thus: "[We need a critic of nostalgia] because everybody already does it. When we look at movies and shows from our youth, they're rarely as good as we remember them, and oftentimes it's quite humorous to compare what you liked then to what you like now. That's basically what the Nostalgia Critic is about, looking back at just how much nostalgia cloaked our vision in heavenly bliss and how bizarre the reality is." This is mostly reflected in the series, but sometimes he reviews whatever is popular at the moment.

Reception
Nostalgia Critic received a positive response with many praising the humor, characters, and Doug Walker's performance. Greg Weisman, producer of Gargoyles, stated that he enjoyed the Critic's review of the show. Roger Ebert called the episode "A Tribute to Siskel and Ebert" "the best, funniest video about Siskel & Ebert I've ever seen". Walker later stated in his editorial titled "Farewell to Roger Ebert" that he has since had the quote framed and hung up on his wall, and in "The Making of a Nostalgia Critic Episode", it can be seen on his desk. Animation writer Paul Dini also thanked the Critic for his episode "The Top 11 Batman: The Animated Series Episodes". Seth Kearsley, director of Eight Crazy Nights, praised the Critic's review of the movie on his Twitter account.
In 2014, Walker and Dante Basco collaborated in a countdown of the top eleven best episodes of the television series Avatar: The Last Airbender, on which Basco had played the character Zuko. Both Bill Farmer, the voice of Goofy, and Jason Marsden, the voice of Max, praised Channel Awesome after watching the Critic's editorial, Is Goofy Secretly Badass? On August 27, 2017, the Critic did a crossover with fellow Channel Awesome critic, Nash Bozard. For Here There Be Dragons, Bozard's review series about fantasy films and adaptations, the Nostalgia Critic and Nash reviewed the short-lived Syfy series The Dresden Files. In 2019, Walker released a music video review of Pink Floyd – The Wall, accompanied by a standalone album, titled The Wall – Nostalgia Critic, featuring Corey Taylor and Rob Scallon. This received overwhelmingly poor reviews from critics and viewers.

See also
 Channel Awesome
 Angry Video Game Nerd
 CinemaSins
 How It Should Have Ended
 Screen Junkies

References

External links

 
 

2000s YouTube series
2010s YouTube series
2020s YouTube series
2007 web series debuts
American comedy web series
Channel Awesome
Comedy-related YouTube channels
Film criticism television series
Internet memes
Nostalgia in the United States
Viral videos
YouTube critics and reviewers